Robert Henry Wynyard  (24 December 1802 – 6 January 1864) was a New Zealand colonial administrator, serving at various times as Lieutenant Governor of New Ulster Province, Administrator of the Government, and was the first Superintendent of Auckland Province.

Early life
He was born in Windsor Castle to William Wynyard, Colonel of the 5th Regiment of Foot and Equerry to King George III. Robert was educated in Dunmow, Essex and joined the British Army as an ensign in the 85th (Duke of York's Own Light Infantry) Regiment, transferring in 1826 to the 58th (Rutlandshire) Regiment of Foot.

He served in Ireland from 1828 to 1841 on the staff of the adjutant general, and was promoted to major in 1841. He returned to England in 1842 and was appointed Lieutenant-colonel in command of the 58th Regiment.

New Zealand
When the regiment was posted to Sydney, Australia in 1844 Wynyard was sent on to New Zealand with 200 men to take part in the Flagstaff War against Hone Heke and Kawiti. Wynyard was present at the siege of Ruapekapeka on 11 January 1846 and in recognition of his services he was appointed a Companion of the Most Honourable Military Order of the Bath; later that year. In December 1846 Wynyard returned to New Zealand to command the forces there until 1858 and was promoted to the rank of colonel in 1854. Somewhere along the line he had a sexual relationship with a Maori woman that produced a male child.

When a fire broke out in Auckland, New Zealand, in 1858, eventually destroying an entire city block, Wynyard was personally on the scene directing the men of the 58th Regiment in firefighting efforts.

Lieutenant-Governor of New Ulster 
From 26 April 1851 to 7 March 1853, Wynyard was Lieutenant-Governor of New Ulster, a province of New Zealand encompassing much of the North Island. He replaced George Dean Pitt, who had died in office. During his term of office, he persuaded the local chiefs Ngāti Tamaterā and Ngāti Raupunga to allow gold mining in the province. The office was abolished when New Zealand was divided into several smaller provinces under the New Zealand Constitution Act 1852.

Superintendent of Auckland Province 
Wynyard elected Superintendent of the new Auckland Province on 12 July 1853, beating William Brown. He held the office until he resigned on 5 January 1855. Wynyard's election to the office was controversial, as he was in charge of the colonial armed forces at the time, and effectively deputy to the Governor. The Colonial Office, on learning that Wynyard had been elected to the office of superintendent, demanded he resign from the role, which he soon did. He was replaced in the role by his previous electoral opponent William Brown.

Administrator of Government 
Wynyard served for two periods (3 January 1854 to 6 September 1855 and 3 October 1861 to December 1861) as Administrator of the Government, in each case between the recall of one Governor and the arrival of the next.

Wynyard opened the 1st New Zealand Parliament on 24 May 1854. He was quickly confronted by the demands of the new Parliament that responsible government be granted immediately; on 2 June the House of Representatives passed a resolution, sponsored by Edward Gibbon Wakefield, to that effect. Wynyard refused, stating that the Colonial Office made no mention of responsible government in its dispatches. The appointed Executive Council advised Wynyard against implementing responsible government, and in the meantime, he sent a dispatch to London requesting clarification. Wynyard then offered to add some elected members of parliament to the Executive Council, and appointed James FitzGerald, Henry Sewell and Frederick Weld to the council. The compromise worked for a few weeks, but on 1 August Parliament demanded complete power to appoint ministers. Wynyard refused, and all three MPs resigned from the council. In response, Wynyard prorogued Parliament for two weeks. On 31 August he appointed Thomas Forsaith, Jerningham Wakefield and James Macandrew to the Executive Council, but when Parliament met again it moved a motion of no confidence in the members.

Parliament met on 8 August 1855, by which time Wynyard had received instructions from the Colonial Office to introduce responsible government. The new Governor, Sir Thomas Gore Browne, arrived on 6 September 1855 and relieved Wynyard of his duties. He resumed his military career and belonged to the 58th Regiment. On 28 January 1858, Wynyard was appointed to the New Zealand Legislative Council. He resigned on 3 November of that year, as the 58th Regiment was recalled to England.

Wynyard's second term as Administrator in 1861 was much less eventful. Filling in between Gore Browne and Sir George Grey, he governed New Zealand for a short period with the advice of responsible Ministers, under Premier William Fox.

Cape Colony 
He acted for Sir George Grey as Governor of Cape Colony twice, from 1859 to 1860 and from 1861 to 1862.

Later life 
Wynyard served as Colonel of the 98th Regiment of Foot from 1863 until his death. He died in Bath, England, in 1864. He had married in Malta in 1826 Anne Catherine McDonell, daughter of Hugh McDonell, the British consul general at Algiers. They had four sons.

Paintings by Wynyard

References

Bibliography 

 
 

Governors of the Cape Colony
1802 births
1864 deaths
Military personnel from Berkshire
King's Shropshire Light Infantry officers
British Army major generals
British colonial governors and administrators in Oceania
Superintendents of New Zealand provincial councils
Members of the New Zealand Legislative Council
1840s in New Zealand
19th-century New Zealand politicians
British military personnel of the New Zealand Wars
58th Regiment of Foot officers